Proneeta Swargiary is an Indian dancer. She is the winner of the dance reality show DID Season 5. Originally from the Baksa Bodoland Territorial Region, in Assam, she became a resident of Delhi after her family moved.

Personal life
Proneeta Swargiary is an Indian dancer who was on the fifth season of Dance India Dance. She became the winner of Dance India Dance 5 with the team of Punit Pathak, named “Punit Ke Panthers” and came into limelight with her performance on “Hoto Pe Bas Tera Naam Hai”. The sole reason for her participating in Dance India Dance was her love for dance. She was also in India's Got Talent and  She was also a competitor in Dance Champions, but was eliminated.

References

Living people
Indian female dancers
Kathak exponents
Dancers from Assam
Year of birth missing (living people)